Go Fer Yer Funk is the first installment of the George Clinton Family Series collection. The album was released in 1992 by P-Vine Records in Japan, and then was released the next year by AEM Records in the U.S. and Sequel Records in the U.K.. The Family Series was designed to present previously unreleased recordings done by various bands in the Parliament-Funkadelic musical stable. The first CD is notable in that it features the title cut "Go Fer Yer Funk" which originally featured a collaboration between P-Funk and Funk legend James Brown.

The final track on all of the Family Series CDs features commentary from George Clinton on the background of each track. All of the Family Series CDs were also available on limited edition vinyl.

Track listing

"Go Fer Yer Funk" (Parliament) - 9:52
"Funk It Up" (Sterling Silver Starship) - 8:46
"Funkin' For My Mama's Rent" (Gary Fabulous & Black Stack) - 5:58
"Send a Gram" (Jessica Cleaves) - 5:32
"Who in the Funk Do You Think You Are?" (Demo) (Sly Stone) - 1:33
"Better Days" (Andre Foxx) - 4:10
"The Chong Show" (Bootsy Collins) - 4:10
"Michelle" (Flastic Brain Flam) - 12:24
"Sunshine of Your Love" (Funkadelic) - 5:33
"Papa George's Rap" - 12:14
(re-titled "Storytime With George "The Archeological Dig""  in the US and "Interview" in the UK)

Personnel
Go Fer Yer Funk

Artist: Parliament (1981)  Producer: George Clinton
Featuring: Funkadelic, Bootsy Collins, Horny Horns, James Brown

Funk It Up

Artist: Sterling Silver Starship (1981) Producer: George Clinton, Ron Dunbar
Lead Vocals, Bass, Drums: Donny Sterling 
Keyboard: Jerome Rogers, Donny Sterling 
Guitar: Rodney Crutcher, Tony Thomas 
Background Vocals: Parlet, Mahlia Franklin, Ron Dunbar

Funkin' For My Mama's Rent

Artist: Gary Fabulous and Black Slack (1980–81) 
Producer: George Clinton, Ron Dunbar
Percussion/Drums: William Payne
Bass: Lige Curry
Guitar: Michael Hampton, Andre Foxxe
Keyboard: David Spradley
Lead Vocals: Gary Fabulous
Background Vocals: Parliament, Funkadelic, Sterling Silver

Send A Gram

Artist: Jessica Cleaves (1980–81)  Producer: George Clinton
Vocals: Jessica Cleaves
Drums: Ty Lampkin
Bass: Danan Potts
Keyboard: David Spradley
Guitar: Cordell Mosson, Ron Bremby
Background Vocals: Andre Williams, Tracey Lewis, George Clinton,
Sidney Barnes, Robert Johnson
Horn & String Arrangements: Bernie Worrell

Who in the Funk Do You Think You Are?

Artist: Sly Stone (1981)  
Piano, Bass, Guitar, Vocals: Sly Stone
Guitar: Ron Ford

Better Days

Artist: Andre Foxxe (1984)  Producer: George Clinton, Garry Shider
Vocals: Andre Foxxe
Guitar: Marvin Williams
Keyboard: David Spradley
Background Vocals: Marvin Williams, Garry Shider

The Chong Show

Artist: Bootsy Collins (1979–80)  Producer: George Clinton, Bootsy Collins
Keyboards, Bass, Guitar, Lead Vocals: Bootsy Collins
Keyboards, Background Vocals: David Spradley
Percussion: Carl "Butch" Small

Michelle

Artist: Treylewd's Flastic Brain Flam (1978–79)  Producer: George Clinton
Guitar: Tracey Lewis, DeWayne McKnight, Garry Shider
Drums: Dennis Chambers
Bass: Jeff "Cherokee" Bunn
Keyboard: Gary Hudgins
Vocals: Tracey Lewis
Background Vocals: Kevin Shider, Andre Foxxe, Tracey Lewis, Patricia Curry, Garry Shider, Linda Shider, Brides, Parlet, Ray Davis, Parliament, Funkadelic, Bootsy's Rubber Band, Steve Pannel, Robert Johnson, Tony Lafoot, Jessica Cleaves

Sunshine of Your Love

Artist: Funkadelic  (1984)  Producer: George Clinton
All instruments by: DeWayne "Blackbyrd" McKnight

External links
 George Clinton and Family Pt. 1: Go Fer Yer Funk (US) (JP) at Discogs

George Clinton (funk musician) albums
1992 albums